Florence Steurer (later Penz, born 1 November 1949) is a French former alpine skier. She competed in the 1968 and 1972 Winter Olympics in the downhill, slalom, and giant slalom events and won a bronze medal in the slalom in 1972. She also finished fourth and sixth in the giant slalom, respectively.

Steurer also won two world championship medals; a silver in combined in 1970 and a bronze in giant slalom in 1966. She has 27 World Cup podiums, including six in downhill, seven in giant slalom, and 14 in slalom. This includes four victories – three in slalom and one in giant slalom. Overall, she finished second in 1969 and third in 1968 and 1970. After retiring from competitions, she became director of a communication agency Duodecim. In 2009, she was made a chevalier of the Legion of Honor. Her husband Alain Penz and father-in-law Claude Penz are also Olympic alpine skiers.

References

1949 births
Living people
French female alpine skiers
Olympic alpine skiers of France
Olympic bronze medalists for France
Olympic medalists in alpine skiing
Medalists at the 1972 Winter Olympics
Alpine skiers at the 1968 Winter Olympics
Alpine skiers at the 1972 Winter Olympics